Skattejakten may refer to:

Skattejakten, a 2005 film directed by Thomas Kaiser.
Skattejakten, a short novel by Margit Sandemo from 1999.